Caryinae is a subtribe of the tribe Juglandeae subfamily in the Juglandaceae.

The Latin description of this subtribe is as follows:

Medulla solida; pollenis grana 3-pora; bracteolae pis- tillatae 2 (ve1 3–5), ad apicem ovarii connatae; positio carpellorum transversa (sensu Manningii); stigmata com- missuralia; papillae stigmnaticae paginam stigmatis brevis, rotundati tegentes, stylo obsolete.

 Subtribe Caryinae
 Carya Nutt. – hickory and pecan
 Annamocarya A.Chev.

Footnotes

 
Plant subtribes